William Daniel Neely Jr. (June 22, 1887 – May 16, 1965) was a college football player.

Early years
William, Jr. was born on June 22, 1887 in Smyrna, Tennessee to William Daniel Neely, Sr. and Mary Elizabeth Gooch. His father William died of sunstroke in 1900.  His brother Jess Neely was a College Football Hall of Fame coach and captain of the undefeated 1922 Vanderbilt Commodores football team.

Vanderbilt University
He was a prominent end and halfback for Dan McGugin's Vanderbilt Commodores football teams. Bill also lettered for the Vanderbilt basketball team.

Football

1910

He was captain of the undefeated and SIAA champion 1910 team, led as well by the likes of W. E. Metzger and Ray Morrison.  That team managed a scoreless tie with defending national champion Yale. Neely recalled the event: "The score tells the story a good deal better than I can. All I want to say is that I never saw a football team fight any harder at every point that Vanderbilt fought today – line, ends, and backfield. We went in to give Yale the best we had and I think we about did it." Neely was selected All-Southern.

Later years
He was a school-teacher and once member of the board of directors of the Rutherford County Creamery and manager of the Production Credit Association of Springfield.

See also
1910 Vanderbilt vs. Yale football game

References

1887 births
1965 deaths
All-Southern college football players
People from Smyrna, Tennessee
American football ends
Vanderbilt Commodores football players
Players of American football from Tennessee
Vanderbilt Commodores men's basketball players
American men's basketball players